Lu Siying (born 4 November 1996) is a Chinese professional racing cyclist, who currently rides for UCI Women's Continental Team .

References

External links

1996 births
Living people
Chinese female cyclists
Place of birth missing (living people)